Melton is a suburb in Melbourne, Victoria, Australia,  west of Melbourne's Central Business District, located within the City of Melton local government area. Melton recorded a population of 7,953 at the 2021 census.

Melton is the central suburb in the satellite city of Melton, located in Melbourne's outer western suburbs.

The suburb is the hub of the city's annual weekend long festival known as "The Djerriwarrh Festival". The festival is most famous for its parade along Melton's main street, High Street. The festival has a carnival atmosphere and features live bands, rides and entertainment for all ages.

Golfers play at the course of the Melton Valley Golf Club on Melton Valley Drive.

References

External links
Shire of Melton official website
History of Melton

Suburbs of Melbourne
Suburbs of the City of Melton